Robert Q. Atkins (born July 7, 1979) is an American comics artist. He attended Illinois State University, earning an undergraduate degree in fine art, and then went on to the Savannah College of Art and Design, where he earned an MFA in Sequential Art.

Bibliography
 The Rift #3-4 (with writer Andrew Lovoulo, Graphic Illusions Studios, 2003)
 The Amazing Spider-Man #515 (co-penciled with Stephan Roux, with writer Fred Van Lente, Marvel Comics, 2004)
 Tales of the Teenage Mutant Ninja Turtles #31 (with writer Quinn Johnson, Mirage Studios, 2004)
 Snake Eyes: Declassified #2-3 (co-penciled with Emiliano Santalucia, writer Brandon Jerwa, Devil's Due Publishing, 2005)
 G.I. Joe Special Missions: Tokyo (with writers Mike O'Sullivan and Sam Wells, Devil's Due Publishing, 2006)
 G.I. Joe Special Missions: Antarctica (with writer Mike O'Sullivan, Devil's Due Publishing, 2006)
 Triple-A Baseball Heroes (with writer Chris Eliopoulos, Marvel Comics, 2007)
 G.I. Joe: The Data Desk Handbook A-M (with writers Mike O'Sullivan and Sam Wells, Devil's Due Publishing, 2007)
 G.I. Joe: Dreadnoks Declassified #3 (with writer Josh Blaylock, Devil's Due Publishing, 2007)
 G.I. Joe: America's Elite #19-20 (inker, with writer Mike O'Sullivan, Devil's Due Publishing, 2007)
 G.I. Joe: America's Elite #17, 19-20, 33 (covers, Devil's Due Publishing, 2007, 2009)
 Legion of Super Heroes in the 31st Century #15 (with writer Jake Black, DC Comics, 2008)
 Heroes #76, 78, 84, 85 (with writers D.J. Doyle, Jeffrey T. Krul, and R.D. Hall, Wildstorm, 2008)
 G.I. Joe #1-7, 13-14 (with writer Chuck Dixon, IDW Publishing, 2008–2010)
 Transformers Spotlight: Doubledealer (inker, writer Simon Furman, IDW Publishing, 2008)
 Forgotten Realms: Starless Night #1 (cover, writers Andrew Dabb, R.A. Salvatore, Devil's Due Publishing, 2009)
 All-New Savage She-Hulk #1 (co-penciled with Peter Vale, writer Fred Van Lente, Marvel Comics, 2009)
 Ultimatum: Fantastic Four Requiem #1 (with writer Joe Pokaski, Marvel Comics, 2009)
 The Amazing Spider-Man #603 (with writer Fred van Lente, Marvel Comics, 2009)

References

External links
 Robert Atkins' blog
 
 Robert Atkins Art - Home
 Robert Atkins' deviantART account
 Post by Robert Atkins detailing his comics career
 Tsunami Studios biography

American comics artists
Living people
Illinois State University alumni
1979 births